The Association of Canadian University Presses/Association des presses universitaires canadiennes (ACUP/APUC) is an association of Canadian university presses. As a collective, the presses that make up the association publish around 600 titles annually, most of which are either authored by Canadians or about Canadian subjects. ACUP/APUC is a member of the International Federation of Scholarly Publishers.

Members
 Athabasca University Press
 Concordia University Press
 McGill-Queen’s University Press
 Memorial University Press
 Nunavut Arctic College Media
 Pontifical Institute of Mediaeval Studies
 Presses de l'Université de Montréal
 Presses de l'Université du Québec
 Presses de l'Université Laval
 University of Alberta Press
 University of British Columbia Press
 University of Calgary Press
 University of Manitoba Press
 University of Ottawa Press
 University of Regina Press
 University of Toronto Press
 Wilfrid Laurier University Press

See also

 List of university presses

References

External links
ACUP Homepage

Publishing-related professional associations
Academic publishing
Scholarly communication
University presses